The Bombing may refer to:

"The Bombing" (Life on Mars), Series 2, Episode 3 of the 2006–2007 UK TV series Life on Mars
Air Strike (2018 film), Chinese-American film